Brachyodes is a genus of beetles in the family Carabidae, containing the following species:

 Brachyodes peguensis Bates, 1892
 Brachyodes subolivaceus LaFerte-Senectre, 1851
 Brachyodes virens Wiedemann, 1823

References

Licininae